Bangers & Mash is a video game published by Alternative Software in 1992 for the Commodore 64, ZX Spectrum, and Amstrad CPC. It is based on the Bangers and Mash children's cartoon series which began in 1989.

Upon its release, critical reviews were generally positive.

References

External links
Bangers & Mash at Spectrum Computing
Bangers & Mash at Gamebase 64

1992 video games
Amstrad CPC games
Commodore 64 games
Fictional chimpanzees
Platform games
Video games about primates
Video games based on animated television series
Video games developed in the United Kingdom
ZX Spectrum games
Alternative Software games